Gösta Artur Roland Pettersson (born 23 November 1940) is a retired Swedish cyclist. As an amateur, he competed in the individual and team road events at the 1960, 1964 and 1968 Olympics and won one silver and two bronze medals, in 1964 and 1968. In 1968 he also took part in two track events: individual and team 4000 m pursuit.

Pettersson's brothers, Erik, Sture and Tomas, were also Olympic cyclists, and their quartet was known as the Fåglum brothers. They won the World Amateur Cycling Championships in 1967–1969 and a team silver medal at the 1968 Summer Olympics; three of the brothers were also part of the bronze-winning road team at the 1964 Games. In 1967 they were awarded the Svenska Dagbladet Gold Medal.

After the 1969 World Championships the Fåglum brothers turned professional. In 1970 Gösta won the Tour de Romandie, Coppa Sabatini and Trofeo Baracchi (with brother Tomas), and finished third at the Tour de France and sixth at the Giro d'Italia. Next year he won the Giro d'Italia, Giro dell'Appennino and Giro delle Marche. During the 1971 Giro he only managed to finish on the stage podium twice and did not win any stages, but was able to win the Maglia Rosa by finishing higher than the GC riders in the time trials and staying with or ahead of them in the mountains.

He finished sixth at the 1972 Giro d'Italia and seventh at the 1973 Tour de Suisse. During the Giro he defeated Merckx in a sprint finish on stage 7 to claim a stage win and come within only +0:10 of Merckx for the overall lead, the only competitor even close to Merckx in the standings. He stayed with the two time Giro champ for the next several stages but ended up losing time in the split time trial of stage 11 and fell back in the standings.

His last major success was second place at the 1974 Tour de Suisse.

Of the Grand Tours he preferred to ride the Giro, competing from 1970-1974 finishing in the top ten four times, never finishing worse than 13th. He rode the Tour De France in 1970 finishing on the podium behind Eddy Merckx and Joop Zoetemelk.

After finishing atop the podium in the Giro, ahead of Herman Van Springel and Italian rider  Ugo Colombo, he started the 1971 TDF, but abandoned the race prior to reaching the Jaques Anquetil Velodrome.

Pettersson never raced in the Vuelta.

Major results

1962
 National Road Championships
1st  Time trial
2nd Road race
 2nd Overall Tour de Tunisie
1st Stage 4
1963
 1st Time trial, National Road Championships
1964
 National Road Championships
1st  Time trial
3rd Road race
 1st Overall Tour de Tunisie
 7th Road race, Summer Olympics
1966
 National Road Championships
1st  Time trial
1st  Team time trial (with Sture Pettersson and Erik Pettersson)
1967
 1st  Team time trial, UCI Road World Championships (with Sture, Tomas & Erik Pettersson)
 National Road Championships
1st  Time trial
1st  Team time trial  (with Sture Pettersson and Erik Pettersson)
 1st Overall Tour du Maroc
 1st Scandinavian Race Uppsala
 2nd Overall Tour de Berlin
1968
 1st  Team time trial, UCI Road World Championships (with Sture, Tomas & Erik Pettersson)
 National Road Championships
1st  Team time trial  (with Sture Pettersson and Erik Pettersson)
2nd Road race
 1st Overall Milk Race
1st Stages 1a (ITT), 1b & 8b (ITT)
 2nd Overall Tour of Yugoslavia
 Summer Olympics
2nd  Team time trial (with Sture, Tomas & Erik Pettersson)
3rd  Road race
1969
 1st  Team time trial, UCI Road World Championships (with Sture, Tomas & Erik Pettersson)
 National Road Championships
1st  Road race
1st  Time trial
1st  Team time trial (with Tomas Pettersson and Erik Pettersson)
 1st Overall Tour d'Algérie
 3rd Overall Tour de l'Avenir
1st Prologue
1970
 1st  Overall Tour de Romandie
1st Stage 4b (ITT)
 1st Coppa Sabatini
 1st Trofeo Baracchi (with Tomas Pettersson)
 1st Stage 1b (ITT) Cronostaffetta
 2nd GP Lugano
 2nd GP Forli
 3rd Overall Tour de France
 5th Giro di Romagna
 5th Overall Giro di Sardegna
 6th Overall Giro d'Italia
 9th Gran Premio Città di Camaiore
 9th GP Alghero
1971
 1st  Overall Giro d'Italia
 1st Giro dell'Appennino
 2nd Overall Paris–Nice
 2nd Overall Setmana Catalana de Ciclisme
 2nd Trofeo Baracchi (with Tomas Pettersson)
 2nd GP Lugano
 2nd Overall Giro di Sardegna
 2nd Baden–Baden (with Tomas Pettersson)
 3rd Milan–San Remo
 3rd GP Forli
 7th Giro dell'Emilia
 7th Trofeo Laigueglia
1972
 2nd Giro di Puglia
 3rd Trofeo Baracchi (with Tomas Pettersson)
 3rd GP Forli
 6th Overall Giro d'Italia
1st Stage 7
 6th Overall Tour de Romandie
 9th Milan–San Remo
 9th Overall Tirreno–Adriatico
 9th Giro dell'Emilia
1973
 1st Stage 1b (ITT) Cronostaffetta
 2nd Trofeo Baracchi (with Davide Boifava)
 3rd Overall Tirreno–Adriatico
 3rd Overall Giro di Sardegna
 7th Overall Tour de Suisse
1st Stage 8b (ITT)
 8th Overall Tour de Romandie
 10th Giro dell'Emilia
1974
 2nd Overall Tour de Suisse
 2nd Trofeo Baracchi (with Martín Emilio Rodríguez)
 4th Overall Volta a Catalunya
 4th GP Lugano
 6th Giro di Toscana
 8th Coppa Placci
 10th Overall Giro d'Italia
 10th Giro di Campania

Grand Tour general classification results timeline

References

External links 

Official Tour de France results for Gösta Pettersson

1940 births
Living people
People from Alingsås Municipality
Swedish male cyclists
Giro d'Italia winners
Cyclists at the 1960 Summer Olympics
Cyclists at the 1964 Summer Olympics
Cyclists at the 1968 Summer Olympics
Olympic cyclists of Sweden
Olympic silver medalists for Sweden
Olympic bronze medalists for Sweden
Olympic medalists in cycling
Tour de Suisse stage winners
Medalists at the 1964 Summer Olympics
Medalists at the 1968 Summer Olympics
Swedish Giro d'Italia stage winners
UCI Road World Champions (elite men)
Fåglum brothers
Sportspeople from Västra Götaland County